Walter Hodges D.D. (died 14 January 1757) was an English academic administrator at the University of Oxford.

Hodges was elected Provost (head) of Oriel College, Oxford, on 24 October 1727, a post he held until his death in 1757.
During his time as Provost of Oriel College, he was also Vice-Chancellorof Oxford University from 1741 until 1744.

References

Year of birth missing
1757 deaths
Provosts of Oriel College, Oxford
Vice-Chancellors of the University of Oxford